Karabük University Square (Turkish: Karabük Üniversitesi Meydanı) is the first urban design project in Karabük, Turkey.

Geography 
The  University Square is located at the edge of Araç Çayı, very close to the main entrance of the Karabük University campus. A square connects the whole university buildings and provides environment for the social life at campus.

History 
At 2010 urban design projects were prepared. Application of the projects was executed by the Karabük University at 2011 and opened to the public the same year.

Design 
Designers of the University Square are Turkish architects Günay Erdem, Sunay Erdem and Serpil Öztekin Erdem.

References 

Karabük
Squares in Turkey
Urban design
Urban public parks
Buildings and structures completed in 2011
21st-century architecture in Turkey